Hired hand may refer to
Hired hand an employee
 Hired Hand, an artist with Fake Four Inc. record label
The Hired Hand, a Western film